An outgrowth of the school hygiene movement, the American School Hygiene Association (ASCHA) was a professional organization of physicians, dentists, administrators, nurses, and other stakeholders in the health and well-being of school children. Formed in 1906,  it involved reformers and politicians of the Progressive movement era, and was active in school health and advocacy issues until its last congress in 1921.

Formation

ASCHA had its birth with a New York City meeting of health care and school personnel on December 3, 1906. The association was formed to "stimulate research and promote discussion of the problem of school hygiene" and "to take an active part in movements wisely aiming to improve the hygienic conditions surrounding children during school life." The stated goal of the association was:

Founding members included Hermann Biggs, Irving Fisher, Henry Goddard, Luther Gulick, and Adolf Meyer.

Membership and activity

Progressive movement era President Theodore Roosevelt was honorary president of ASCHA from 1907 to 1908, and in 1909 he convened the first White House Conference on the Care of Dependent Children.

ASCHA had thirteen congresses (or conferences), along with published proceedings, from its inception, which promoted "programs focusing upon a healthy school environment, including proper sanitation, the screening of children for health problems, and adequate health instruction."

In 1912, it partnered with the American Medical Association (AMA) to establish "teaching of practical physiology and hygiene in public and private schools."

The final congress of the ASCHA was in 1921.

Legacy

While many schools during this era adopted only physical education instead of a comprehensive school health education, ASCHA "helped shape the developing school hygiene education movement." Some of its members went on to form the American Association of School Physicians in 1926, which in 1936 was renamed the American School Health Association (ASHA). ASHA is still active in the advocacy and research of school health-related issues.

See also
School hygiene
Hygiene
School health education
Public health

References

External links
Proceedings of the Fifth Congress of the American School Hygiene Association on Google Books
Extract from Science magazine regarding ASCHA

Hygiene
Medical and health organizations based in New York (state)
1906 establishments in New York City
1921 disestablishments in the United States
Organizations established in 1906
Organizations disestablished in 1921